The Ministry of Foreign Affairs of Guatemala is the executive office in charge of conducting the international relations of the country. This ministry can give the Guatemalan nationality, enforces the immigration laws of the country, preserves the national limits and boundaries, negotiates international treaties and agreements with other countries and preserves the copies of the ones signed by Guatemala. It is appointed by law to preserve the national interests overseas and to be part of the National Security System.

Background and history 

Starting in the 19th century, right after independence from Spain was signed, the public administration was slowly organized. There was a first stage when Guatemala was a part of the United Provinces of Central America, and a second stage starting in 1847, when Guatemala became an independent, free and sovereign republic to administer its own public affairs. Through that time, the different executive offices were organized as "secretariats", following the Spanish nomenclature. This terminology included the Secretariat of Foreign Affairs, which kept its name until after the Revolution of 1944. Decree #47, passed by the Revolutionary Joint on December 27, 1944, still used this category. However, when the new Constitution came into force on March 15, 1945, the Constitutional system created the Ministries of State. For that reason, Congress passed a bill for the organization of the Executive Branch, which first spoke of a Foreign Affairs Ministry, on April 25, 1945.

Foreign affairs 

Currently, Guatemala holds diplomatic relations with 152 countries. It has 41 embassies throughout the World, and 4 missions in International Organizations.

See also
Minister of Foreign Affairs (Guatemala) for a list of foreign ministers from 1945 to the present day.

References 

Government of Guatemala
Foreign relations of Guatemala
Ministries of Guatemala
Foreign affairs ministries
Foreign policy
International relations
Public policy
Diplomacy